Misato Katsuragi's Reporting Plan (葛城ミサト報道計画, Katsuragi Misato Hōdō Keikaku) was a Namco Bandai online game for the PlayStation 3. It was based on the anime character Misato Katsuragi from the popular Neon Genesis Evangelion franchise. Utilizing a subscription-based access model, the game could be played on the PlayStation Portable through Remote Play and was released exclusively for the Japanese market.

Interface

Interactivity included real-time motion sensitive 360° zoom-in/zoom-out and character customization (hair style). Advanced customization (character's costume selection, scenery selection, etc.) and PSN Trophies were both unlocked with a service subscription. The game used high quality real-time cel-shaded animation to produce anime-like visuals.

As in the animated series, Misato Katsuragi's voice was performed by Kotono Mitsuishi. Background music incorporated European classical violin pieces. The service was shut down on June 5, 2010.

See also
Mainichi Issho

Notes

External links
Misato Katsuragi's Reporting Plan official website
Misato Katsuragi's Reporting Plan online game manual

2009 video games
PlayStation Network games
PlayStation 3-only games
Bandai games
Japan-exclusive video games
PlayStation 3 games
Neon Genesis Evangelion games
Video games developed in Japan
Single-player video games